A chronological list of works by the composer Bruno Maderna.

Sources:

Compositions 
 Alba, contralto solo, string orchestra (probably 1937–1940)
 La sera fiesolana, tenor solo, chamber ensemble (probably 1938–1939) (incomplete)
 Piccolo Concerto, piccolo solo, orchestra (1941) (incomplete)
 Concerto per pianoforte e orchestra, piano solo, orchestra (1942) (lost)
 Introduzione e passacaglia "Lauda Sion Salvatorem", orchestra (1942)
 Quartetto per archi, string quartet (before 1946)
 Concertino, probably identical with Serenata or Piccolo Concerto 
 Requiem, SATB solos, choir, orchestra (probably 1945–1946) (incomplete)
 Serenata, chamber ensemble (1946)
 Liriche su Verlaine, voice and piano (1946–1947)
 Concerto per due pianoforti e strumenti, 2 pianos, 2 harps, celesta, percussion ensemble (1947–1948)
 Tre liriche greche, soprano solo, chorus, chamber ensemble (1948)
 Fantasia per due pianoforte (B.A.C.H. variations), 2 pianos (1948)
 Composizione no. 1, orchestra (1948)
 Symphonic Fragment, orchestra (1949–1950?)
 Composizione no. 2, orchestra (1950)
 Studi per "Il Processo" di Franz Kafka, speaker, soprano solo, orchestra (1950)
 Studi per il "Llanto" di Federico Garcia Lorca, tenor, flute, guitar (1950–1952?) (incomplete)
 Improvvisazione no. 1, orchestra (1951–1952)
 Musica su due dimensioni, flute, cymbal, tape (1952)
 Das eiserne zeitalter, orchestra (1952–1953?) (incomplete)
 Quattro lettere (Kranichsteiner Kammerkantate), bass or baritone solo, soprano solo, chamber ensemble (1953)
 Improvvisazione no. 2, orchestra (1953)
 Divertimento in due tempi, flute, piano (1953)
 Flötenkonzert, flute solo, orchestra (1954)
 Composizione in tre tempi, orchestra (1954)
 Serenata no. 2, chamber ensemble (1954, rev. 1957)
 Sequenze e strutture, tape (1954–1955) (lost)
 Ritratto di città, tape (1955) with Luciano Berio and Roberto Leydi
 Quartetto per archi, string quartet (1955)
 Notturno, tape (1956)
 Syntaxis, tape (1957)
 Dark Rapture Crawl, orchestra (1957) (first movement of Divertimento per orchestra by Berio and Maderna)
 Continuo, tape (1958)
 Musica su due dimensioni (second version), flute, tape (1958)
 Concerto per pianoforte e orchestra, piano solo, orchestra (1958–1959)
 Dimensioni II/Invenzione su una voce, tape (1960?)
 Serenata III, tape (1961)
 Serenata IV, flute, chamber ensemble, tape (1961)
 Honeyrêves, flute, piano (1961–1962)
 Macbeth, unknown instrumentation (probably 1962) (incomplete)
 Komposition für oboe, kammerensemble und tonband/Konzert für oboe und kammerensemble, oboe, chamber ensemble, tape (1962–1963)
 Don Perlimpin, flute solo, orchestra (1962)
 Le Rire, tape (1962)
 Dimensioni III, flute and piccolo solo, orchestra (1963)
 Entropia I, section of Dimensioni III (1963)
 Entropia II, section of Dimensioni III (1963)
 Aria, soprano solo, flute solo, orchestra (1964)
 Dimensioni IV, flute solo, chamber ensemble (1964) (includes Dimensioni III and Aria)
 Hyperion, includes Dimensioni IV, Le Rire, and Dimensioni II (1964)
 Stele per diotima, solo violin, clarinet, bass clarinet, horn, orchestra (1965)
 Hyperion II, version of Dimensioni III with flute cadenzas, and Entropia II (1965)
 Hyperion, version of Dimensioni III with piccolo solos and Aria (1966)
 Hyperion III, includes Stele per diotima, piccolo solos from Dimensioni III, Aria, and other parts of Dimensioni III (1966)
 Hyperion IV, version of Hyperion (1966 version), Hyperion II, and Suite aus der Oper 'Hyperion (1969)
 Aulodia per Lothar, oboe d'amore, guitar (1965)
 Amanda/Serenata VI, chamber ensemble (1966)
 Widmung, solo violin (1967)
 Concerto per oboe e orchestra no. 2, solo musette and oboe d'amore, orchestra (1967)
 Hyperion en het geweld, includes Hyperion and new material (1968)
 Hyperion - Orfeo dolente, includes movements from Hyperion interspersed with the five intermedii of Domenico Belli's Orfeo Dolente (1968)
 Entropia III, section of Suite aus der Oper 'Hyperion''' (1968–1969)
 Gesti, version of Entropia III (1969?)
 Suite aus der Oper 'Hyperion, 2 solo flutes, solo oboe, speaker, chorus, orchestra (1969–1970)
 Quadrivium, orchestra (1969)
 Concerto per violino e orchestra, violin solo, orchestra (1969)
 Serenata per un satellite, chamber ensemble (1969)
 Ritratto di Erasmo, tape (1969)
 From A to Z/Von A bis Z, tape (1969)
 Grande Auloida, orchestra (1970)
 Tempo libero, tape (1970
 Juilliard Serenade/Tempo libero II, chamber ensemble (1970–1971)
 Viola (o Viola d'amore), solo viola or viola d'amore (1971)
 Y despuès, guitar solo (1971)
 Solo, musette, oboe, oboe d'amore, cor anglais (one player) (1971)
 Pièce pour Ivry, solo violin (1971)
 Ausstrahlung, tape, soprano, orchestra (1971)
 Dialodia, 2 flutes, 2 oboes, or other instruments (1971)
 Venetian Journal, tape, tenor solo, chamber ensemble (1971–1972)
 Aura, orchestra (1972)
 Biogramma, orchestra (1972)
 Giardino religioso, chamber ensemble (1972)
 Ages, tape (1972)
 All the World's a Stage, 2 SATBar choirs (1972)
 Satyricon'', solo voices, chamber ensemble (1971–1973)
 Concerto no. 3 pour hautbois et orchestre, oboe solo, orchestra (1973)
 Concerto per due pianoforti, violoncello e orchestra (begun 1973) (lost, incomplete)

References

Maderna, Bruno, compositions by